Jakob Stam (born 17 July 1972) is a Dutch professional football coach and former player. As a player, he played as a centre-back and is regarded as one of the best defenders of his generation.

Stam played for several European clubs including PSV Eindhoven, Manchester United, Lazio, Milan and Ajax before retiring in October 2007. As well as club trophies, he won several personal awards, including being voted the best defender in the 1998–99 and 1999–2000 UEFA Champions League, as well as being included in three consecutive PFA Team of the Year sides from 1999 to 2001. Stam played 67 international matches for the Netherlands, scoring three goals. He was in their squads for three UEFA European Championships and the 1998 FIFA World Cup. 

After retiring as a player, Stam worked as a coach at PEC Zwolle and Ajax before making his managerial debut with Reading in 2016. He later managed Feyenoord in 2019 and FC Cincinnati of Major League Soccer.

Club career

Early career
Born in Kampen, Overijssel, Stam started his career with local amateur football club DOS Kampen. On 15 August 1992, Stam made his professional debut for FC Zwolle in a 1–1 draw against SC Heracles in the Eerste Divisie. He became a first team regular right away and moved to Eredivisie club Cambuur Leeuwarden for the following season, but relegated in his first season which brought him back into the Eerste Divisie. Two seasons at Cambuur earned him a transfer to Eredivisie club Willem II. At Willem II, he immediately impressed at the Eredivisie level, which meant his final breakthrough. A shock 1–0 home victory over Ajax led to Stam's transfer to PSV Eindhoven in the same season in which they eventually won the KNVB Cup, his first professional trophy.

PSV
Stam was a key player for PSV in the 1996–97 season, as the team won the Eredivisie league championship and the Johan Cruyff Shield. Individually, Stam won the VVCS Footballer of the Year award.

In 1998, Stam became the then most expensive defender in history when Manchester United bought him for £10.6 million.

Manchester United
Stam spent three seasons at Manchester United, during which time United won three Premier League titles, one FA Cup, the Intercontinental Cup and the UEFA Champions League. He scored his only goal for the club in a 6–2 away victory against Leicester City.

Early in the 2001–02 season, Stam was controversially sold to Lazio in Italy after Manchester United manager Sir Alex Ferguson was reportedly upset by allegations Stam had made in his autobiography Head to Head about the club. Stam made numerous statements in the book about his views on opposing players, and alleged that Ferguson's approach to buy him was done without the permission of PSV. Later, Simon Kuper reported that contrary to initial belief, Ferguson had noticed that Stam's tackling numbers were declining and simply assumed the defender was past his playing peak. Laurent Blanc was signed as his replacement.

In 2007, however, Ferguson described the decision to sell Stam as an error: "At the time he had just come back from an achilles injury and we thought he had just lost a little bit. We got the offer from Lazio, £16.5m for a centre back who was 29. It was an offer I couldn't refuse. But in playing terms it was a mistake. He is still playing for Ajax at a really good level." On the financial report, Manchester United announced the fee was £15.3 million; Lazio declared the fee was £16 million.

Lazio
During his time with Lazio, Stam was found guilty of having the banned steroid nandrolone in his system following a Serie A game, and received a five-month ban, which was eventually reduced by a month after appeals. He was the second Lazio player suspended in 2001, after Fernando Couto. 
In his last season at the club, he won the Coppa Italia.

Milan
Stam joined Milan after UEFA Euro 2004. He reached his second Champions League final with the Rossoneri in 2005, but was a runner-up after his team was defeated by Liverpool in a penalty shoot-out.

Ajax
On 30 January 2006, it was announced that he would return to the Eredivisie and play for Ajax, where he signed a two-year contract for a €2.5 million transfer fee. Stam was named team captain upon his arrival at the club. In his first season, he won both the Johan Cruyff Shield and the KNVB Cup; another Johan Cruyff Shield was added to his trophies at the start of the 2007–08 season.

On 29 October 2007, Stam announced his retirement from professional football with immediate effect after playing six league games for Ajax in the 2007–08 league season. His final game was in a 0–0 draw against NEC on 20 October 2007.

International career

Stam made his debut for the Netherlands on 24 April 1996 in a 1–0 friendly defeat to Germany in Rotterdam. He was not initially chosen for UEFA Euro 1996, but was later added to the squad after an injury ruled out Frank de Boer; he did not however make any appearances at the tournament. He scored his first goal on 6 September 1997 in a 3–1 home win over rivals Belgium in World Cup qualification. He was also an important player in the Dutch team that finished fourth in the 1998 FIFA World Cup.

During UEFA Euro 2000, he once again reached the semi-finals with the Dutch team, hosted in his home country and Belgium. Stam missed his attempt in the penalty shoot-out in the semi-finals, hitting the ball over the bar in a defeat against Italy. He was not originally scheduled to take a penalty, but had to due to substitutions and fatigue among his teammates.

Stam reached his third semi-finals in an international competition with his nation at UEFA Euro 2004 in Portugal and retired from international football after the tournament. The reason cited for his international retirement was that he wanted to focus on his new team, Milan, as well as his family.

In total, he played 67 matches for the Netherlands, scoring three goals.

Playing style
Considered by several pundits to be one of the best defenders of his generation, as well as one of the greatest Dutch and Premier League defenders in history, Stam played primarily as a centre-back. He was known for possessing "a rare combination of speed, strength and ball-playing ability", as well as an excellent positional sense, and a powerful shot. Due to his wide range of skills, in his prime he was also capable of playing as a full-back on the right flank.

Post-playing career
In October 2008, Stam returned to Manchester United as a scout for the club, responsible for most of South America.

Soccer Aid
Stam has been involved with Soccer Aid, which puts celebrities and football legends together in two teams (England and Rest of the World) for a charity game in aid of UNICEF. Stam has appeared in five Soccer Aid matches 2008, 2012, 2014, 2016 and 2018.

Coaching and managerial career
In 2009, Stam became an assistant coach for PEC Zwolle, and on 30 October was appointed caretaker manager. Following his stint with Zwolle, Stam penned a three-year contract with Ajax in 2013 as an assistant coach, and as defensive coach starting in the 2013–14 Eredivisie season. On 28 May 2014, Stam was revealed as one of the new managers of Jong Ajax, the reserve team in the Eerste Divisie. He was joined by Andries Ulderink and they signed a contract beginning on 1 July 2014 and lasting until 30 June 2016.

Reading
On 13 June 2016, Stam was appointed as manager of English Championship club Reading on an initial two-year contract. He enjoyed a successful first season with the club, leading them to the Championship play-offs. On 4 July 2017, Stam signed a new two-year contract extension with Reading, keeping him at the club until 2019. On 21 March 2018, Reading announced that Stam had left the club with immediate effect following a run of one win in 18 league matches left the team 20th in the league table.

PEC Zwolle

On 28 December 2018, Stam was appointed as the new manager of Eredivisie club PEC Zwolle on a year-and-a-half contract.

Feyenoord
On 6 March 2019, Feyenoord announced that Stam would succeed Giovanni van Bronckhorst as Feyenoord's new manager. He signed a two-year contract, effective 1 June 2019. Following a 0–4 defeat to Ajax, Stam resigned on 28 October 2019, saying "I've thought about this for a long time. My final conclusion is that it's better for the club, the players and myself if I step aside."

FC Cincinnati

On 21 May 2020, Major League Soccer club FC Cincinnati announced that Stam would succeed interim manager Yoann Damet. He signed a year-and-a-half contract. On 15 July, he won 1–0 on his debut against an Atlanta United FC side managed by his former international teammate Frank de Boer.

Stam was dismissed on 27 September 2021, with Cincinnati second-from-bottom in the Eastern Conference having won four of 25 games.

Personal life
Stam is a Protestant. He met his wife Ellis when he was 16, and they have two daughters and twin sons. His first daughter's birth was induced two weeks early, to come between the 1998 World Cup and pre-season training for Manchester United. When he played for Manchester United, he lived in Wilmslow in Cheshire.

Career statistics

Club

International
Appearances and goals by national team and year

Managerial statistics

*Some of Stam's record comes from the MLS is Back tournament. However, the tournament is essentially the MLS 2020 season.

Honours

PSV
Eredivisie: 1996–97
KNVB Cup: 1995–96
Johan Cruyff Shield: 1996, 1997

Manchester United
Premier League: 1998–99, 1999–2000, 2000–01
FA Cup: 1998–99
UEFA Champions League: 1998–99
Intercontinental Cup: 1999

Lazio
Coppa Italia: 2003–04

Milan
Supercoppa Italiana: 2004

Ajax
KNVB Cup: 2006–07
Johan Cruyff Shield: 2006, 2007

Individual
Dutch Footballer of the Year: 1997
Dutch Golden Boot: 1997
UEFA Club Best Defender of the Year: 1998–99, 1999–2000
PFA Team of the Year: 1998–99 Premier League, 1999–2000 Premier League, 2000–01 Premier League
ESM Team of the Year: 1998–99
Overseas Team of the Decade – Premier League 10 Seasons Awards (1992–93 – 2001–02)
FIFPro World XI Nominee 2005

Books
Stam, J., with Butler, J. (contrib.) (2002), Head to Head, Willow Publishing,

References

External links

World Footballer of the Year 1999 12th

1972 births
Living people
People from Kampen, Overijssel
Footballers from Overijssel
Dutch footballers
Association football defenders
PEC Zwolle players
SC Cambuur players
Willem II (football club) players
PSV Eindhoven players
Manchester United F.C. players
S.S. Lazio players
A.C. Milan players
AFC Ajax players
Eerste Divisie players
Eredivisie players
Premier League players
Serie A players
UEFA Champions League winning players
Netherlands international footballers
UEFA Euro 1996 players
1998 FIFA World Cup players
UEFA Euro 2000 players
UEFA Euro 2004 players
Dutch sportspeople in doping cases
Doping cases in association football
Dutch expatriate footballers
Dutch expatriate sportspeople in England
Dutch expatriate sportspeople in Italy
Expatriate footballers in England
Expatriate footballers in Italy
Dutch football managers
Manchester United F.C. non-playing staff
PEC Zwolle managers
AFC Ajax non-playing staff
Jong Ajax managers
Reading F.C. managers
Feyenoord managers
Eerste Divisie managers
English Football League managers
Eredivisie managers
Dutch expatriate football managers
Expatriate football managers in England
FC Cincinnati coaches
PEC Zwolle non-playing staff
Dutch Protestants
Expatriate soccer managers in the United States
Dutch expatriate sportspeople in the United States
FA Cup Final players